El Teniente ("The Lieutenant") is an underground copper mine located in the Chilean Andes,  above mean sea level.  It is in the commune of Machalí in Cachapoal Province, Libertador General Bernardo O'Higgins Region, near the company town of Sewell. This was established for the workers and their families.

Mining at El Teniente is reported to have started as early as 1819. In the early 20th century, two men from New York, United States set up a mining operation there, starting operations in 1906. Kennecott Copper Corporation, based in Utah, United States, later operated the mine through their subsidiary company. The Chilean government bought a 51% interest in the mine in 1967. Some 15,000 people lived in Sewell at its height as a company town.

In 1971 Chile nationalized copper production under President Salvador Allende and formed the state-owned copper mining company Codelco. This company still operates the mine. Workers began to live in other areas.

Typically more than 5,000 workers were involved in production.

Since 2011, a structural project called New Mine Level (NML) has been underway at El Teniente. It consists of expanding the mine deeper into the hill at 1,880 meters above sea level. The project is being carried out without interrupting the operation of El Teniente Division.

History
According to legend, the El Teniente mine was discovered in the 1800s by a fugitive Spanish official. Exploitation of the resource began in 1819.  The best ore was mined manually in what would be called the Fortuna sector, and transported out of the mine by animal, such as ponies and mules. It was worked until 1897, when the high-grade ore was exhausted.

In 1904 William Braden (an engineer from New York City, United States) and E.W. Nash formed the Braden Copper Company. They built a road for carts and a concentrating plant, which was in operation by 1906.

In June 1910, Guggenheim Exploration took control of the mine and provided financing. In 1916 Braden became a subsidiary company of Kennecott Copper Corporation, which was based in Utah.

Chileans have referred to such large-scale copper mining operations as La Gran Minería del Cobre (a major copper mine). Before nationalization, these operations generated a large proportion of the foreign currency which the country received.

In 1945 there was a disaster at El Teniente mine, resulting in the deaths of 355 men and injury to 747 more. It was the largest mining accident in Chilean and has the highest death toll in world history associated with metal extraction. Some 1,000 miners were down in the pits when the fire started in a nearby warehouse. Dense smoke spread in the underground tunnels. Most of the dead and injured suffered carbon monoxide poisoning. Emergency exits were not well marked. In Chile, this incident is known locally as the Smoke Tragedy.

In 1967 the Chilean government bought a 51% stake in the mine and founded Sociedad Minería El Teniente.

On July 11, 1971, President Salvador Allende ordered the Chilean nationalization of copper, in an effort for the country to gain more benefit from the mines. Corporación Nacional del Cobre de Chile (known as Codelco) was formed, and El Teniente became a state-owned operation.  The Chilean government paid Kennecott $92.9-million for the property.

The Vancouver, British Columbia-based, Canadian company Amerigo produces both a copper and molybdenum concentrate from El Teniente's tailings. It has been granted the right also to treat higher grade tailings from a large, abandoned tailings impoundment near the El Teniente property.

Geology
The copper ore deposits are those of a typical copper porphyry and associated alteration-mineralization.  These altered zones include chalcopyrite, pyrite, bornite and molybdenite as hypogene minerals and chalcocite as a supergene mineral.  The ore body surrounds the Braden Pipe in a continuous ring with a width of 2000 feet.  The pipe is a geologic structure in the shape of an inverted cone, having a surface diameter of 4000 feet, and consisting of post-pipe breccia called the Braden Formation.  The boundary of the pipe is marked by this post-pipe breccia and a pre-pipe breccia forming a belt up to 200 feet wide.  "The Braden Pipe was a center of strong mineralization and structural weakness before the pipe was formed."  Copper mineralization and pipe formation occurred in the Pliocene.  Ore was originally mined from the Fortuna orebody at the southwest quadrant starting in 1906.  Since 1922, the larger Teniente orebody has also been mined on the east side.  "The best grade of ore is found in altered andesite or in andesitic flow breccia adjacent to the pre-pipe breccia."

Mineralization at El Teniente is thought to be indebted to its position at the intersection of two large fault systems. This favoured the rise of magma and the subsequent circulation of mineral-rich fluids.

Labour disruptions
As of 2007 Codelco employed 17,000 direct-hire company employees and 28,000 contract employees across all their operations.  There have been multiple labour disruptions at the El Teniente mine, where about 5,000 workers produce the ore.

1983
In 1983 El Teniente and two other Codelco mines closed when approximately 13,000 workers voted to strike "indefinitely" in protest of a union leader's arrest for calling for an end to military rule in Chile.  In total among the three mines, at least 3,300 workers and 37 labour leaders were fired for participating in the strike.

2008
Contract workers went on strike at Codelco mines in 2008.  El Teniente and two other Codelco mines were closed, El Teniente for the shortest length.  Company employees continued to work; however, striking workers closed access to the mines and threw stones at buses transporting employees from the mine to the town of Rancagua.  At least one employee was injured; he was hit by a metal object thrown by a protester on the highway leading to the mine.

See also
Escondida
Chanarcillo
Los Pelambres mine
Potrerillos, Chile
Chuquicamata
El Salvador mine
Mining in Chile

References

Copper mines in Chile
Mines in O'Higgins Region
Underground mines in Chile